Geniusmatcher is an Israeli company based in Haifa, founded in 2012 by Frida Issa and Pablo Garcia-Morato Fernandez-Baillo. They have created a patented platform combining computer vision and 3D technology to create a hardware-free solution for mapping, positioning and navigating in any indoor location. Their first product for shopping centers, MALLY (My Mall in Hebrew מולי), with its interactive 3D maps, that tells the visitor where they are standing and what is around them. It also shows how to get to each spot and who is there to share their experience with. The platform is an end-to-end solution, dynamic content and notification support, with 2D to 3D automatic conversion, managed in the cloud and displayable on all mobile devices.

On February 2014, the company joined Wayra,⁣ the Telefonica global accelerator and opened offices in  London and Madrid (managed by Jorge García-Morato - Geniusmatcher's COO).

Technology 
MALLY is a hardware free and user oriented map, targeted to help users find their way and to understand their environment. MALLY 3D Maps provide the user an immersive experience, merging reality with the virtual world. MALLY uses the smartphone or tablet built-in camera to locate the users where GPS does not work or is not accurate enough. There is no extra hardware required or installations. The system detects the user's exact position and sets it over the 3D Map.

Content 
The content is published by the platform customers, initially shopping centers. They access a CMS where they can both create the 3D maps automatically by scanning 2D plans (PNG, JPEG, PDF) and they can create and assign all the content to be displayed (shops info, offers, events, etc.).

References 

Software companies of Israel
Companies based in Haifa